BNS Kapatakhaya is an  offshore patrol vessel of the Bangladesh Navy. She entered service with the Bangladesh Navy in 2003.

History
Built by Hall, Russell & Company, she was modelled on the ocean-going trawlers FPV Jura (1973) and FPV Westra (1974). The vessel was laid down in 1975 and launched on 22 October 1976. She was commissioned into the Royal Navy as HMS Shetland (P298) on 14 July 1977. In 2002 she was sold to the Bangladesh Navy.

Career
Kapatakhaya transferred on 31 July 2002. On 4 May 2003, she was commissioned into the Bangladesh Navy. She is currently serving under the command of the Commodore Commanding BN Khulna (COMKHUL).

BNS Kapatakhaya took part in Exercise Shomudro Torongo, a joint bilateral exercise with the Royal Navy at Ganges delta region in Bangladesh from 29 April to 3 March 2009.

BNS Kapatakhaya participated in Exercise Milan, a biennial multilateral exercise at Andaman Islands in India in February 2010.

See also
List of active ships of the Bangladesh Navy

References

Bibliography

External links
Image as HMS Shetland

Ships of the Bangladesh Navy
Patrol vessels of the Bangladesh Navy
Island-class patrol vessels of the Bangladesh Navy
1976 ships
Ships of the Fishery Protection Squadron of the United Kingdom
Ships built by Hall, Russell & Company